Meat Cove (Scottish Gaelic: Camas na Feòla) is a rural fishing community at the northern tip of Inverness County on Nova Scotia's Cape Breton Island.

Meat Cove is the most northerly settlement in Nova Scotia and is located in the Sydney—Victoria federal electoral district.  It's accessed north of Capstick on 8 km of a gravel road.

Communications
The Postal Code is B0C 1E0
The Telephone exchange is 902-383

On August 21, 2010, torrential rains washed away parts of the only access road to Meat Cove leaving several unable to get away from the remote community. According to local sources, the bridge repair was completed as of October 21, 2010.

References

External links
 Meat Cove on Destination Nova Scotia

Communities in Inverness County, Nova Scotia
General Service Areas in Nova Scotia